Guildford railway station is located on the Main South line, serving the Sydney suburb of Guildford. It is served by Sydney Trains T2 Inner West & Leppington and T5 Cumberland line services.

History
Guildford station opened in April 1876. In 2002, a new footbridge with lifts was built.

Platforms & services

Transport links
Transdev NSW operates two routes via Guildford station:
906: Fairfield station to Parramatta station
916: to Chester Hill station

Transit Systems operates three routes via Guildford station:
820: to Merrylands station via Guildford West
821: to Woodpark via Guildford West
822: to Merrylands station via Railway Terrace

Guildford station is served by one NightRide route:
N60: Fairfield station to Town Hall station

References
"The Guildford Story" Australian Railway Historical Society Bulletin January 1986 pages 3–20
"That Guildford Article Revisited" Australian Railway Historical Society Bulletin December 1997 pages 442–448

External links

Guildford station details Transport for New South Wales

Easy Access railway stations in Sydney
Railway stations in Sydney
Railway stations in Australia opened in 1876
Main Southern railway line, New South Wales
Cumberland Council, New South Wales